Bad girl art is a superheroine artwork style trend that emerged during the 1990s.

History

The term "bad girl art" was coined in the 1990s as an allusion – and contrast – to the "good girl art" movement that started in the 1940s, and is used to refer to the trend of femme fatale heroines that started in the early 1990s. The "bad girl" art trend was derived from the exaggerated visual styles of the male and female form first used in the late 80s by artists such as Rob Liefeld and Jim Lee. The precursors to the trend were Vampirella, created by publisher James Warren in 1969, and Marvel Comics' Elektra, created by Frank Miller in 1981.

Notable "bad girl" characters in the 1990s include the Harris Comics revival of Vampirella; Lady Death, created by writer Brian Pulido and artist Steven Hughes in 1991; Razor, created by Everette Hartsoe in 1992; Shi, created by Billy Tucci in 1993; Angela, created by Neil Gaiman in 1993; Glory and Avengelyne, created by Rob Liefeld in 1993 and 1995 respectively, and Witchblade, created by Marc Silvestri in 1995.

"Bad girl" characters dress in revealing costumes, possess shapely physiques, are morally ambiguous, wield supernatural powers or are of a supernatural nature, and have no compunction about killing their enemies.

See also
 Girls with guns
 Modern Age of comic books
 Pin-up girl
 Portrayal of women in American comics

References

Further reading
 

1990s introductions
 
Feminism and the arts